Alabama's 9th congressional district was formerly apportioned to portions of central and western Alabama from 1893 until 1963 when the seat was lost due to reapportionment after the 1960 United States Census.

Highlights
Formed in 1893, the district was first represented by Louis Washington Turpin, a self-educated tax assessor from Hale County. The district was represented by Democrats during the whole of its existence except from 1896-1897 when Truman Heminway Aldrich, a Republican, unseated Oscar W. Underwood in a post-election contest.

The 1960 United States Census and the subsequent reapportionment decreased Alabama's representation in the United States Congress.

History

Population disparity
By the early 1940s the 9th district had a population of 459,930.

List of members representing the district

Historical Boundaries

References
Specific

General
Population data from U.S. Census Bureau: Population of Counties by Decennial Census: 1900 to 1990
Additional population data and counties from the Official Congressional Directories of the 53rd Congress (1893); 58th Congress (1903); 81st Congress (1950); and 83rd Congress (1953).

Congressional Biographical Directory of the United States 1774–present

Former congressional districts of the United States
09
1893 establishments in Alabama
1963 disestablishments in Alabama
Constituencies established in 1893
Constituencies disestablished in 1963